Adiganahalli may refer to:

 Adiganahalli, Bangalore Urban district, a village in Karnataka, India
 Adiganahalli, Mysore district, a village in Karnataka, India